Herbicide safeners are chemical compounds used in combination with herbicides to make them "safer" – that is, to reduce the effect of the herbicide on crop plants, and to improve selectivity between crop plants vs. weed species being targeted by the herbicide.  Herbicide safeners can be used to pretreat crop seeds prior to planting, or they can be sprayed on plants as a mixture with the herbicide.

References

Herbicides